The 100 mm field gun M1944 (BS-3) was a Soviet 100 mm anti-tank and field gun.

History

Development 

The BS-3 was based on the B-34 naval gun. The development team was led by V. G. Grabin.

World War II 
During World War II the Soviet Army employed the gun in the light artillery brigades of tank armies (20 pieces along with 48 ZiS-3) and by corps artillery. In the Second World War the BS-3 was successfully used as a powerful anti-tank gun. It was capable of defeating any contemporary tank at long range, excluding the Tiger Ausf B: to destroy that heavy tank the gun needed to shoot at less than 1600 m from the target. The gun was capable of defeating the turret of Tiger II at a range of 800–1000 meters. The gun was also used as a field gun. Though in this role it was less powerful than the  122 mm A-19, as it fired a smaller round, the BS-3 was more mobile and had a higher rate of fire.

Post World War II 
The BS-3 remained in service into the 1950s. As of 1955 it was getting replaced in Soviet service by the T-12 antitank gun and the 85 mm antitank gun D-48. A number of BS-3 pieces are still stored in Russian Ground Forces arsenals. In 2012, at least 12 BS-3 guns were still active with the 18th Machine Gun Artillery Division, located on the Kuril Islands, used as anti-ship and anti-landing guns.

The BS-3 was also sold to a number of other countries and in some of these countries the gun is still in service.

Russo-Ukrainian War 
During the Russo-Ukrainian War (2014-present) both sides employed towed anti-tank guns. The use of the 100 mm Rapira is well known, but the Ukrainian Army also used the older BS-3. There are records of three Ukrainian BS-3's getting destroyed when Russia launched the 2022 Russian invasion of Ukraine. Up till October 2022 there were no signs of Russia deploying the BS-3 in Ukraine.

Ammunition data
Ammunition
 AP: BR-412
 APBC: BR-412B, BR-412D
 HE/Fragmentation
 Projectile weight
 AP/APBC: 15.88 kg (35 lbs)
 HE/Fragmentation: 15.6 kg (34.39 lbs)
 Armor penetration (BR-412B, 30° degrees)
 500 m : 190 mm(547 yds : 6.29 in)
 1000 m : 170 mm(1,093 yds : 6 in)

Operators

See also 
100 mm vz. 53 - A similar Czech anti-tank gun using the same ammunition.
D-10 tank gun
8.8 cm KwK 43- A contemporary German tank gun with similar performance

Notes

References
 Shunkov V. N. - The Weapons of the Red Army, Mn. Harvest, 1999 (Шунков В. Н. - Оружие Красной Армии. — Мн.: Харвест, 1999.) 
 Christopher F. Foss, Artillery of the World

External links
Armor penetration table

Field artillery of the Cold War
World War II artillery of the Soviet Union
World War II anti-tank guns
Anti-tank guns of the Soviet Union
100 mm artillery
Arsenal Plant (Saint Petersburg) products
Weapons and ammunition introduced in 1944